"Kingyo Hanabi" (金魚花火; Goldfish Fireworks) is Ai Otsuka's fifth single. It was released by avex trax on August 18, 2004. The DVD version was sold simultaneously. It became the theme song of the Japanese television program "Super TV". 50,000 limited edition copies were sold which included a picture book drawn by Otsuka. It reached number three on the Oricon charts.

Music video
'Kingyo Hanabi' is a simple video that shows Otsuka singing underwater and on a small island during dawn/dusk. While Otsuka is on the island, she holds a firework in her hand that emits golden sparks, which then rain down around Otsuka who is under the water. Otsuka sits on a veranda looking at a man and reaches out tentatively, but he moves away before she can hold his hand. She then slowly falls to the ground and cries before disappearing.

Track listing

References 
avex network inc. (2006), Ai Otsuka Official Web Site

2004 singles
Ai Otsuka songs
2004 songs
Songs written by Ai Otsuka
Song recordings produced by Max Matsuura
Avex Trax singles